Pachymerium is a genus of centipedes in the family Geophilidae. Centipedes in this genus range from 2 cm to 8 cm in length and have 37 to 79 pairs of legs. This genus contains the following species:

Pachymerium antipai Capuse, 1968
Pachymerium armatum Silvestri, 1905
Pachymerium attenuatum (Say)
Pachymerium brevicornis (Lucas, 1849)
Pachymerium capense Attems, 1947
Pachymerium caucasicum Attems, 1903
Pachymerium coiffaiti Demange, 1959
Pachymerium cubanum Matic et al., 1977
Pachymerium dragani Capuse, 1975
Pachymerium escherichi (Verhoeff)
Pachymerium ferrugineum (C. L. Koch, 1835)
Pachymerium folkmanovae (Dobroruka, 1966)
Pachymerium grandiceps (Porat, 1893)
Pachymerium idium Chamberlin, 1960
Pachymerium imbricatum Attems, 1934
Pachymerium minutum (Seliwanoff, 1884)
Pachymerium monticola Muralewicz, 1926
Pachymerium multipes (Sseliwanoff, 1881)
Pachymerium pereirai Shear & Peck, 1992
Pachymerium pilosum (Meinert, 1870)
Pachymerium rioindianum Matic et al., 1977
Pachymerium serratum Verhoeff, 1943
Pachymerium syriacum Attems, 1903
Pachymerium tabacarui Capuse, 1968
Pachymerium tridentatum Lawrence, 1960
Pachymerium tristanicum Attems, 1928
Pachymerium tyrrhenum Verhoeff, 1934
Pachymerium zelandicum Attems, 1947

References

Centipede genera
Geophilomorpha